Catskill may refer to the following in the U.S. state of New York:

 Catskill (town), New York, in Greene County
 Catskill (village), New York, in the above town
 Catskill Creek, a tributary of the Hudson River
 Catskill Mountains
 Catskill Park, a protected area in the Catskill Mountains
 Bark mill, also known as Catskill's mill